Olá is a district (distrito) of Coclé Province in Panama. The population according to the 2000 census was 5,671. The district covers a total area of 381 km². The capital lies at the town of Olá.

Administrative divisions
Olá District is divided administratively into the following corregimientos:

Olá (capital)
El Copé
El Palmar
El Picacho
La Pava

References

Districts of Coclé Province